Leon James was a prominent American Lindy Hop and jazz dancer. A performer during the 1930s and 1940s with the Harlem-based Whitey's Lindy Hoppers, he and his partner Willa Mae Ricker were featured in a photo essay in the August 23, 1943, issue of Life magazine, demonstrating air steps.

In 1935, James and Edith Matthews won the Harvest Moon Ball. 

Due to poor eyesight, James was not drafted during World War II.

During the 1950s and 1960s, James partnered with Al Minns to promote the dances they helped to pioneer, appearing at dance events, in short films, and on TV.

Filmography
 A Day at the Races (1937)
 Keep Punching (1939)
 Excerpted and released as the short Jittering Jitterbugs (aka The Big Apple) in 1943
 Cootie Williams and his Orchestra (1942)
 The Spirit Moves (1950)
 Jazz Dance (1954)

See also
 Al & Leon

References

Year of birth missing
Place of birth missing
Date of death missing
Place of death missing
American male dancers
Lindy Hop
1970 deaths
20th-century American dancers